Jamides ferrari, the Ferrar's cerulean, is a small butterfly found in India that belongs to the lycaenids or blues family. It is named after Michael Lloyd Ferrar.

See also

List of butterflies of India
List of butterflies of India (Lycaenidae)

References
 
  
 
 
 
 

Jamides
Butterflies of Asia
Butterflies described in 1932